Martha Lane Fox, Baroness Lane-Fox of Soho,  (born 10 February 1973) is a British businesswoman, philanthropist and public servant. She co-founded Last Minute during the dotcom boom of the early 2000s and has subsequently served on public service digital projects. She sits on the boards of WeTransfer and Chanel, as well as being a trustee of The Queen's Commonwealth Trust. She previously served on the board of Channel 4.

She entered the House of Lords as a crossbencher on 26 March 2013, becoming its youngest female member; she was appointed Chancellor of the Open University on 12 March 2014. In October 2019, she was named by media and marketing publication The Drum as the most influential woman in Britain's digital sector from the past quarter of a century.

Early life 
Born in London, Lane Fox is the daughter of academic and gardening writer Robin Lane Fox, the scion of an English landed gentry family seated at Bramham Park. She was educated at Oxford High School, an all-girls private school in Oxford, and at Westminster School, a public school in London with a mixed-sex sixth form. She read Ancient and Modern History at Magdalen College, Oxford, and graduated with a 2:2 BA degree, advancing MA.

Career 
Lane Fox joined information technology and media consulting firm Spectrum, where she met Brent Hoberman. In 1998, Lane Fox and Hoberman founded Last Minute, an online travel and gift business. She stepped down as managing director in 2003. Last Minute was bought by Sabre Holdings in 2005.

Following her departure from Last Minute, Lane Fox was tipped to take over day-to-day operations at Selfridges but was involved in a car accident before she could assume that role. At the suggestion of advertising executive Julian Douglas, Fox teamed up with Nick Thistleton to launch karaoke company Lucky Voice. In 2007, Lane Fox joined the board of Marks & Spencer.

From 2009 to 2013 she was the Digital Champion for the UK and helped to create the Government Digital Service – this team launched gov.uk, and was given the task of spearheading a two-year campaign to improve computer literacy.
The following year she was assigned to establish the Digital Public Services Unit within the Cabinet Office.
 and invited to sit on the Cabinet Office Efficiency and Reform Board. The following month Lane Fox was honoured by David Cameron for her "Manifesto for a Networked Nation", a challenge to increase British internet engagement. She resigned from her position as Digital Champion in late 2013.

She entered the House of Lords as a crossbencher on 26 March 2013, becoming its youngest female member. In her maiden speech, she addressed the need for digital literacy in all sectors of the economy. That same year the Open University appointed her Chancellor. In the run-up to the Scottish independence referendum of 2014, Lane Fox signed an open letter opposing Scottish independence.

In 2017, Lady Lane-Fox was appointed a member of the Joint Committee on National Security Strategy. In 2018, she was appointed Non-Executive Director of Chanel as well as Donmar Warehouse and a Trustee of the Queen's Commonwealth Trust. Lane Fox continues to be a Patron of AbilityNet, Reprieve, Camfed and Just for Kids Law. She joined the board of social network Twitter in June 2016. In 2020, Lane Fox was appointed to the board of directors of the company WeTransfer.

Charity work 
Lady Lane-Fox is an advocate for such causes as human rights, women's rights, and social justice. In 2007, she founded Antigone, a grant-making trust to support charities based in the United Kingdom. She is a patron of Reprieve, a legal action charity, and CAMFED, an organization dedicated to fighting poverty, HIV, and AIDS in rural Africa through an emphasis on education of young women. She is also patron of the charity Just for Kids Law, which supports children and young people in London, as well as fighting for wider reform on behalf of young people across the UK.

When the telecommunications company Orange withdrew its longstanding support for the Orange Prize, Lane Fox was one of several benefactors, along with Cherie Blair and Joanna Trollope, who offered to sustain the contest until another major sponsor could be found.

Honours and awards 
Lane Fox was appointed Commander of The Most Excellent Order of the British Empire (CBE) in the 2013 New Year Honours for "services to the digital economy and charity". In February 2013 she was assessed to be one of the 100 most powerful women in the United Kingdom by Woman's Hour on BBC Radio 4. In the same month it was announced that she was to be created a life peer to sit as a crossbencher in the House of Lords. An she was also recognized as one of the BBC's 100 women of 2013.

On 25 March 2013, she was created a Life Peer as Baroness Lane-Fox of Soho, of Soho in the City of Westminster, and was introduced in the House of Lords the next day. On 29 October 2015, Lane Fox was ranked 15th on the Richtopia list of 100 Most Influential British Entrepreneurs. In February 2016, Lane Fox was elected a Distinguished Fellow of BCS, The Chartered Institute for IT, after being nominated by The Duke of Kent.

In October 2019, Lane Fox was named by media and marketing publication The Drum, in association with the Futures Network, Innovate Her and WACL, as the most influential woman in Britain's digital sector from the past quarter of a century.

Arms

Personal life 
Lady Lane-Fox lives in Marylebone, London, with her partner Chris Gorell Barnes. Their identical twin sons, Milo and Felix, were born in 2016. In May 2004, she was severely injured in a car accident in the tourist resort of Essaouira in Morocco and was flown to England for treatment at John Radcliffe Hospital, Oxford, and later Wellington Hospital in London. She was discharged from hospital in December 2005.

See also 
 Lane Fox family
 Fox family
 Felicity Lane-Fox, Baroness Lane-Fox

Further reading
 Burke's Landed Gentry (1965 Edn): LANE FOX of Bramham Park

Notes

References 

1973 births
Living people
Martha
People educated at Oxford High School, England
People educated at Westminster School, London
Alumni of Magdalen College, Oxford
Crossbench life peers
Commanders of the Order of the British Empire
Life peeresses created by Elizabeth II
20th-century English businesspeople
21st-century English businesspeople
Directors of Twitter, Inc.
BBC 100 Women
Fellows of the British Computer Society
20th-century English businesswomen
21st-century English businesswomen
People's peers